South Beach State Park is a state park in the U.S. state of Oregon, administered by the Oregon Parks and Recreation Department. It is near the unincorporated community of South Beach.

At South Beach State Park

Camping is available, as are yurts.

Various fossils are found there, as are agates.

See also
 List of Oregon state parks

References

External links
 

State parks of Oregon
Parks in Lincoln County, Oregon